This article is a list of saints canonized by Pope Leo XIII.

See also
List of saints canonized by Pope Pius XI
List of saints canonized by Pope Pius XII
List of saints canonized by Pope John XXIII
List of saints canonized by Pope Paul VI
List of saints canonized by Pope John Paul II
List of saints canonized by Pope Benedict XVI
List of saints canonized by Pope Francis

References

Leo XIII
19th-century Christian saints